A list of notable alumni and staff affiliated with Shawnigan Lake School, Vancouver Island, British Columbia, Canada. This list alumni known within fields including  artists, athletes, broadcasters, businesspeople, musicians, actors, politicians, scholars, and scientists.

Notable alumni

Artists 

Peter Saul – Artist 
 Robert Stewart Hyndman – Artist

Athletes 

 George Hungerford – Gold Medal Olympian – Rowing
 John Lecky – Silver Medal Olympian – Rowing
 Hannah Darling – Rio 2016 Olympic Bronze Medal, 2015 Pan American Games Gold Medal, Women's Rugby 7's Team Canada 
Kristopher McDaniel '00 (Canadian National Rowing Team - Bronze Medal in the M2+ at the 2007 WORLD ROWING CHAMPIONSHIPS - MUNICH, GER)
Bryan Donnelly '92 (Canadian National Rowing Team - 2000 OLYMPIC GAMES - SYDNEY, AUS)
George Hungerford '62 (Canadian National Rowing Team - Gold Medal in the M2- at the 1964 OLYMPIC GAMES - TOKYO, JPN)
John Lecky '57 (Canadian National Rowing Team - Silver Medal in the M8+ at the 1960 OLYMPIC GAMES - ROME, ITA)
John Lander (rower) - 1928 Olympic Gold Medalist, coxless four

Entertainment 

 Jon Kimura Parker – Order of Canada, Concert Pianist
 Tara Spencer-Nairn – Actress, Corner Gas

Politics 

 The Hon. Henry Pybus Bell-Irving – Lt. Governor of British Columbia
 Peter Ladner – Vancouver City Councillor
 Stephen D. Owen – Former Member of Parliament
 Anthony Vincent - Canadian ambassador to Peru and later, to Spain

Scholars and scientists 

 Graham Anderson – Scholar
 Dr. Barry F. Cooper – Canadian Political Scientist
 Dr. Steve Deering – Computer Scientist
 Dr. Roger Stanier – Microbiologist

Notable staff 

 Tom Brierley – Cricketer
 James Robertson Justice – Actor

References 

Shawinigan Lake School